Potassium thiocyanate is the chemical compound with the molecular formula KSCN.  It is an important salt of the thiocyanate anion, one of the pseudohalides.  The compound has a low melting point relative to most other inorganic salts.

Use in chemical synthesis
Aqueous KSCN reacts almost quantitatively with Pb(NO3)2 to give Pb(SCN)2, which has been used to convert acyl chlorides to isothiocyanates.

KSCN converts ethylene carbonate to ethylenesulfide.  For this purpose, the KSCN is first melted under vacuum to remove water.  In a related reaction, KSCN converts cyclohexene oxide to the corresponding episulfide.

C6H10O  +  KSCN  →  C6H10S  +  KOCN

KSCN is also the starting product for the synthesis of carbonyl sulfide.

Other uses
Dilute aqueous KSCN is occasionally used for moderately realistic blood effects in film and theater. It can be painted onto a surface or kept as a colorless solution. When in contact with ferric chloride solution (or other solutions containing Fe3+), the product of the reaction is a solution with a blood red colour, due to the formation of the thiocyanatoiron complex ion. Thus this chemical is often used to create the effect of 'stigmata'. Because both solutions are colorless, they can be placed separately on each hand. When the hands are brought into contact, the solutions react and the effect looks remarkably like stigmata.

Similarly, this reaction is used as a test for Fe3+ in the laboratory.

References

Thiocyanates
Potassium compounds
Photographic chemicals